In the United States, the first full week of September is designated National Blood Donation Week.  Established in 2016, the week United States is to hold individual state blood donation days. This serves to assist blood banks all over the country to keep their shelves full and to raise awareness of the continual need to donate blood and blood products. The final day of the week holds most of the states' blood donation days, and is known as National Blood Donation Day.

Background
2016 was plagued with massive reports of blood bank supply shortages. The epidemic of the Zika virus was beginning, causing many who donated blood routinely to abstain from donating for at least a month.  36,000 units of blood are needed each day in the U.S. With mass casualties that occurred during the summer, including the Orlando nightclub shooting and the Dallas officer shooting, a united campaign was necessary to increase the nation's blood supply.

Syndicated radio host and physician Daliah Wachs had created Nevada Blood Donation Day in 2015 in response to local blood shortages, and partnered with United Blood Services and the American Red Cross to create a state day, proclaimed by Governor Brian Sandoval.  She vowed to help expand this nationally, and in 2016 she created this campaign with United Blood Services, American Red Cross and blood banks throughout the country.

In 2016, governors in the following states proclaimed September 10 to be their state Blood Donation Day:

 Alabama
 Alaska
 Arkansas 
 Connecticut 
 Florida
 Georgia
 Illinois
 Indiana
 Iowa
 Louisiana
 Maine
 Maryland
 Massachusetts
 Minnesota
 Mississippi 
 Missouri
 Montana
 Nebraska
 New Hampshire
 New Mexico 
 North Carolina
 North Dakota
 Oklahoma
 Oregon
 Pennsylvania
 Rhode Island
 South Dakota
 Utah
 Vermont 
 Washington
 Wisconsin

The first Tuesday in September has been designated Michigan Blood Donation Day.

In 2017, National Blood Donation Day fell on September 8, the Friday of National Blood Donation Week.

Governors in the following states proclaimed September 8 to be their state Blood Donation Day for 2017:
 Alabama
 Arkansas
 Colorado
 Delaware
 Florida
 Georgia
 Hawaii
 Idaho
 Illinois
 Indiana
 Iowa
 Louisiana
 Maine
 Massachusetts
 Michigan
 Minnesota
 Mississippi
 Missouri
 Montana
 Nebraska
 Nevada
 New Jersey
 New Hampshire
 New Mexico
 North Carolina
 Ohio
 Oregon
 Pennsylvania
 Rhode Island
 South Carolina
 South Dakota
 Tennessee
 Utah
 Vermont
 Virginia
 Washington
 Wisconsin
 Wyoming

Arizona declared Arizona Blood Donation Week September 4–10. Maryland declared Maryland Blood Donation Day to be September 7.

In 2018, National Blood Donation Day fell on September 5, the Wednesday of National Blood Donation Week.

Governors in the following states proclaimed September 5 to be their state Blood Donation Day for 2018:
 Alabama
 Arkansas
 Colorado
 Delaware
 Florida
 Georgia
 Hawaii
 Idaho
 Illinois
 Indiana
 Iowa
 Kentucky
 Louisiana
 Maine
 Maryland
 Massachusetts
 Michigan
 Minnesota
 Mississippi
 Missouri
 Montana
 Nebraska
 Nevada
 New Hampshire
 New Jersey
 New Mexico
 North Carolina
 Ohio
 Oregon
 Pennsylvania
 Rhode Island
 South Carolina
 South Dakota
 Tennessee
 Utah
 Virginia
 Washington
 West Virginia
 Wisconsin

Arizona has proclaimed September 3-10th Arizona Blood Donation Week. Oklahoma proclaimed the month of September Blood Donation Month. Alaska proclaimed the month of July Blood Donation Month.

Governors in the following states proclaimed September 5 to be their state Blood Donation Day for 2019:

 Alabama
 Arkansas
 Connecticut
 Delaware
 Georgia
 Florida
 Idaho
 Indiana
 Iowa
 Kansas
 Maine
 Maryland
 Michigan
 Missouri
 Montana
 Nebraska
 Nevada
 New Hampshire
 New Jersey
 North Carolina
 North Dakota
 Ohio
 Oklahoma
 Pennsylvania
 Rhode Island
 South Carolina
 Tennessee
 Utah
 Vermont
 Washington
 West Virginia
 Wisconsin
 Wyoming

Arizona has proclaimed September 2-9th Arizona Blood Donation Week

For 2020, National Blood Donation Week fell on September 1–7, with National Blood Donation Day on September 4. Despite many governor's offices dealing with limited staff and resources, with many "suspending proclamations", governors in the following states proclaimed September 4 to be their state Blood Donation Day:

 Alabama
 Colorado
 Delaware
 Florida
 Hawaii
 Idaho
 Indiana
 Iowa
 Kentucky
 Louisiana
 Maine
 Maryland (September 5)
 Massachusetts
 Michigan
 Missouri
 Montana
 Nevada
 New Hampshire
 New Jersey (September 5)
 New Mexico
 North Dakota
 Oklahoma
 Pennsylvania 
 Rhode Island
 South Carolina
 Tennessee 
 Utah
 Vermont
 West Virginia
 Wisconsin
 Wyoming

With Arizona proclaiming September 1-7th Arizona Blood Donation Week.

In 2021, National Blood Donation Week is September 1–7, with National Blood Donation Day September 4. Governors in the following states proclaimed September 4 to be their state Blood Donation Day:
 Alabama
 Arkansas
 Colorado
 Connecticut
 Delaware
 Florida
 Georgia
 Hawaii
 Idaho
 Illinois
 Indiana
 Iowa
 Kansas
 Kentucky
 Louisiana
 Maine
 Maryland
 Massachusetts
 Michigan
 Minnesota
 Missouri
 Mississippi
 Montana
 Nebraska
 Nevada
 New Hampshire
 New Jersey
 New Mexico
 North Carolina
 North Dakota
 Ohio
 Oklahoma
 Oregon
 Pennsylvania
 Rhode Island
 South Carolina
 South Dakota
 Tennessee 
 Utah
 Vermont
 Virginia
 West Virginia
 Wisconsin
 Wyoming

Arizona has declared September 1–7 Arizona Blood Donation Week.

In 2022, National Blood Donation Week is September 1–7, with National Blood Donation Day September 4. Governors in the following states are proclaiming September 4 to be their state Blood Donation Day:
 Arkansas
 Connecticut
 Delaware
 Florida
 Georgia
 Hawaii
 Idaho
 Illinois
 Indiana
 Iowa
 Kansas
 Kentucky
 Louisiana
 Maine
 Maryland
 Massachusetts
 Michigan
 Mississippi
 Missouri
 Montana
 Nebraska
 Nevada
 New Hampshire
 New Jersey
 New Mexico
 North Carolina
 North Dakota
 Ohio
 Oklahoma
 Oregon
 Pennsylvania
 Rhode Island
 South Carolina
 South Dakota
 Tennessee
 Utah 
 Vermont
 Virginia
 Washington
 West Virginia
 Wisconsin
 Wyoming 

Alaska has proclaimed Alaska Blood Donation Week during 9/1-9/7.
Arizona has proclaimed Arizona Blood Donation Week during 9/1-9/7

References

Majority of governors proclaim donation days (kdwn)
Nevada expands donation to a week (review journal)
Hawaii blood bank need donors after hurricane (west hawaii)
Sept 10 designated blood donation day (Bossier Press)
Governors united during blood donation week (GCN live)

Blood donation
September observances